The Foton Toano (图雅诺) is a light commercial vehicle (van) built by Foton of Beijing, China as a van, chassis cab, and minibus.

Overview
The Foton Toano was produced by Chinese car manufacturer Foton since 2015, and the styling is controversial as the exterior design heavily resembles the Mercedes-Benz Sprinter van. 

The Foton Toano is equipped with a 2.8 liter ISF Cummins CRDI turbo diesel engine, which generates 160 horsepower and 360 Nm of torque. The Toano is also Euro IV compliant. 

It can accommodate 15 passengers with a high ceiling, making it possible to stand up inside the vehicle.

Gallery

References

External links

Official Website
Foton Toano Detail Video

Vans
Foton Motor vehicles
Cars of China
2010s cars
Minibuses